The River Unk is a small river in Shropshire, England that runs for  before flowing into the River Clun.

Course

Nature
The river is one of the few remaining sites in the United Kingdom where freshwater pearl mussels are found. The Environment Agency has taken land next to the banks of the river to prevent cattle entering the water and silting up the riverbed.

References

External links

U
2Unk